Temple Place Historic District is a national historic district at 11-55, 26-58 Temple Place in Boston, Massachusetts.  The district encompasses a set of fifteen well-preserved 19th and early-20th century buildings representing the increasing commercialization of the area, which was a fashionable upper-class address in the late 18th century.  The earliest buildings date from the 1830s and are Greek Revival in style.  Three buildings (29-43 Temple Place) were designed by noted Boston architect Nathaniel J. Bradlee, and are rare surviving examples of his work which predate the Great Boston Fire of 1872; one building (25-27 Temple) was designed by Peabody and Stearns.

The district was added to the National Register of Historic Places in 1988. Among the former tenants: Ritz & Hastings, photographers (1860s-1880s).

See also 
 National Register of Historic Places listings in northern Boston, Massachusetts

References

Historic districts in Suffolk County, Massachusetts
National Register of Historic Places in Boston
Historic districts on the National Register of Historic Places in Massachusetts